Tanglang, or Tholo, is a Loloish language spoken by 947 people in 8 villages of southern Tai'an Township 太安乡, Lijiang County, Yunnan, including in Hongmai 红麦  and Shuijing 水井村 villages. Tanglang has been in long-term contact with Bai, and is also in contact with Naxi.

Tanglang is taught in local schools.

Names
Tanglang speakers are referred to by the following names.
autonym: tʰo42 lo42 zɑ33 (Tulusha 吐鲁沙)
exonym in Heqing County: Tanglangzi 堂郎子
exonym of the Nalu 那鲁 (Heihua 黑话) people: Moxie 麽些
exonym in Jianchuan County 剑川县: tʰo31 lo31 χo33
exonym in Lijiangba District 丽江县坝区: tʰo33 le33 dʌ31
exonym in Nanshan 南山: lu55 lu33

References

External links
 Tanglang numbers

Loloish languages
Languages of China